Conus lienardi or Lienard's cone is a species of sophisticated predatory sea snail, a marine gastropod mollusk in the family Conidae, the cone snails, cone shells or cones.
 

Like all species within the genus Conus, these snails are predatory and venomous. They are capable of "stinging" humans, therefore live ones should be handled carefully or not at all.

Distribution
This is an Indo-Pacific species, occurring in Melanesia and off New Caledonia.

Shell description
The size of the shell varies between 24 mm and 63 mm . The spire is raised, carinated and slightly striate. The body whorl is distantly grooved below. The color of the shell is yellowish brown, variously longitudinally covered with zigzag chestnut or chocolate markings; sometimes almost or quite covered with chocolate.

Etymology
The specific name honours the French-Mauritian naturalist François Liénard de la Mivoye.

References
Notes

Bibliography
 Sowerby, G.B. III (1881). Descriptions of eight new species of shells. Proc. Zool. Soc. Lond. (1881): 635-639
 Filmer R.M. (2001). A Catalogue of Nomenclature and Taxonomy in the Living Conidae 1758 - 1998. Backhuys Publishers, Leiden. 388pp
 Tucker J.K. (2009). Recent cone species database. September 4, 2009 Edition
 Tucker J.K. & Tenorio M.J. (2009) Systematic classification of Recent and fossil conoidean gastropods. Hackenheim: Conchbooks. 296 pp.
 Puillandre N., Duda T.F., Meyer C., Olivera B.M. & Bouchet P. (2015). One, four or 100 genera? A new classification of the cone snails. Journal of Molluscan Studies. 81: 1-23

External links
 Conus lienardi image - a picture of the shell that this snail produces.
 Cone Shells - Knights of the Sea
 

lienardi
Gastropods described in 1861